Jiří (Juraj) Paclt (15 January 1925 – 18 September 2015) was a Czechoslovakian botanist and entomologist. Although born and raised in the Czech part of Czechoslovakia, he spent the majority of his work life in the Slovak part that later became Slovakia. His scientific work is characterised by a wide scope of interests and activities, ranging from botany over mineralogy to entomology.

Personal life and education
Jiří Paclt was born in Prague to Marie (né Šrámková; 1883 – 1953), a housewife, and Ing. Emil Paclt (1880 – 1953), a mechanical engineer working in the Chief Technical Council at ČSD. He grew up in Prague, where he went to elementary school from 1931 to 1936, followed by high school from 1936 to 1944. After graduation, he was assigned as a laborer to the company Autoavia as part of the Protectorate "Totaleinsatz" (total deployment). After the end of World War II, he enrolled at the Faculty of Natural Sciences at Charles University in Prague. He completed his studies in October 1948 with rigorous examinations in botany and zoology and defended his diploma thesis entitled "Monografie rodu Catalpa" ("Monograph of the genus Catalpa"), graduating on 3 June 1949 and receiving the title of RNDr. He published his diploma thesis from 1950 to 1954 in seven parts in English as "Synopsis of the genus Catalpa (Bignoniaceae)". As an employee of the Institute of Experimental Phytopathology and Entomology at the Center of Biological and Ecological Sciences of the Slovak Academy of Sciences in Ivanka pri Dunaji, he conducted his doctoral studies as an external student. On 5 June 1972 he received the scientific title of Candidate of Biological Sciences based on his thesis "Defense reactions and premature pathogenic extinction of woody plants".

Jiří Paclt was married to his wife Vera, né Vaněčková (*1920, Prague – †2006, Bratislava), with whom he had three children: the daughters Helena (a high school teacher) and Eva (an economist), and the son Roman (an engineer and programmer). After many years of various health problems, Paclt died on 18 September 2015 at the age of 90.

Scientific work
From 1949 to 1954, Paclt worked as a researcher at the Forest Research Institute in Bratislava. In the following years until 1962, he was a researcher at the Institute of Biology of the Slovak Academy of Sciences in Bratislava, where he first worked in the Faunistic Laboratory, and later in the Zoology Department. He spent almost 30 years of his work life, from 1962 to 1990, at the Institute of Experimental Phytopathology and Entomology in Ivanka pri Dunaji, from where he eventually retired.

Both his diploma and doctoral thesis focused on botanical topics, and Paclt continued with research in botany throughout his work life. His main focuses were phytopathology, cecidogenesis (the forming of galls), non-pathogenic cancer growth, non-pathogenic nodule growth, facultative and obligatory nodosities (root deformations), mycotic causes of wilting of some fruit tree species, and the problem of early death of apricot trees. He was a knowledgeable expert in the research field of flaws of timber, especially the red heartwood core of beeches and the variegation of beech wood.

Throughout his life, Paclt worked on various groups of hexapods. His main groups of interest were springtails, proturans, diplurans, jumping bristletails, silverfish, butterflies and moths, beetles and mayflies, of which he studied the morphology, taxonomy, systematics, ecology and zoogeography.

Among his accomplishments in mineralogy are the record of fichtelite from Slovakia and of subfossil liptobiolite from Israel.

Described taxa
He described 34 new species and subspecies, 49 genera, three subfamilies and two families, and he introduced 12 nomina nova:

Acari – mites and ticks
 Belba bartosi Paclt & Winkler, 1961

Diplura

 Campodea vihorlatensis Paclt, 1961
 Deutojapyx Paclt, 1957
 Didymocampa Paclt, 1957
 Evalljapyx leleuoporum Paclt, 1976
 Japyx ascanius Paclt, 1965
 Japyx izmir Paclt, 1957
 Japyx kosswigi Paclt, 1965
 Japyx turcicus Paclt, 1965
 Acrocampa Paclt, 1957
 Adinocampa Paclt, 1957
 Camachancampa Paclt, 1957
 Catacampa Paclt, 1957
 Chaocampa Paclt, 1957
 Cocytocampa Paclt, 1957, nomen novum for Microcampa Silvestri, 1934
 Dyseocampa Paclt, 1957
 Holocampa Paclt, 1957
 Idiocampa Paclt, 1957
 Metajapyx strouhalae Paclt, 1957
 Mimocampa Paclt, 1957
 Mixocampa Paclt, 1957
 Monojapyx Paclt, 1957
 Notojapyx Paclt, 1957
 Notojapyx tillyardi pagesi Paclt, 1957, nomen novum for Japyx tillyardi relata Womersley, 1939
 Ombrocampa Paclt, 1957
 Pleocampa Paclt, 1957
 Tricampodella Paclt, 1957
 Tychocampa Paclt, 1957
 Ultrajapyx Paclt, 1957
 Plusiocampinae Paclt, 1957
 Syncampinae Paclt, 1957

Archaeognatha – jumping bristletails

 Haslundichilis beckeri Paclt, 1960
 Hybographitarsus zebu Paclt, 1969
 Hypermeinertellus Paclt, 1969
 Mixomachilis Paclt, 1972, now a synonym of Mesomachilis
 Mixomachilis remingtoni Paclt, 1972, now a synonym of Mesomachilis nearcticus
 Neomachilellus nevermanni Paclt, 1969
 Petridiobius Paclt, 1970
 Petridiobius arcticus Paclt, 1970
 Petrobius canadensis Paclt, 1969
 Pseudomachilanus Paclt, 1969
 Pseudomachilanus sechellarum Paclt, 1969
 Machilontus sutteri borneensis Paclt, 1969
 Petrobiinae Paclt, 1970

Collembola – springtails

 Aposinella Paclt, 1971
 Choreutinula Paclt, 1944, nomen novum for Beckerella Axelson, 1912
 Cyphoderus trinervoides Paclt, 1965
 Diamantinum Paclt, 1959
 Folsomia anglicana Paclt, 1952
 Folsomia sexoculata Paclt, 1952
 Handschinphysa Paclt, 1945, nomen novum for Microphysa Handschin, 1925
 Neohypogastrura Paclt, 1944
 Odontella arvensis Paclt, 1961
 Pogonognathellus Paclt, 1944, nomen novum for Pogonognathus Boerner, 1908
 Prorastriopes canariensis Paclt, 1964, current generic combination Fasciosminthurus canariensis
 Prorastriopes strasseni Paclt, 1964, current generic combination Fasciosminthurus strasseni
 Prorastriopes webbi Paclt, 1964
 Rastriopes schultzei Paclt, 1959
 Tomocerus terrestralis Paclt, 1957

Zygentoma – silverfish

 Acanthinonychia Paclt, 1963
 Apteryskenoma Paclt, 1953, nomen novum for Bakerella Womersley, 1928
 Anarithmeus Paclt, 1962
 Anisolepisma Paclt, 1967
 Battigrassiella Paclt, 1963, nomen novum for Grassiella Silvestri, 1912
 Comphotriura Paclt, 1963
 Ctenolepisma boettgeriana Paclt, 1961
 Ctenolepisma confusum Paclt, 1967
 Diabateria Paclt, 1963
 Dodecastyla Paclt, 1974
 Dromadimachilis Paclt, 1969
 Hemilepisma Paclt, 1967, nomen novum for Braunsina Escherich, 1904
 Heteromorphura Paclt, 1963
 Hybographitarsus Paclt, 1969
 Hypermeinertellus weidneri Paclt, 1969
 Lasiotheus Paclt, 1963, a subgenus of Gastrotheus Casey, 1890
 Leniwytsmania Paclt, 1957
 Lepidina dunckeri Paclt, 1974
 Lepidotriura Paclt, 1963
 Metagraphitarsus Paclt, 1969
 Neonicoletia Paclt, 1979
 Neonicoletia quinterensis Paclt, 1979
 Nicoletia phytophila Paclt, 1961
 Paracrotelsa Paclt, 1967
 Proatelurina Paclt, 1963
 Trichodimeria Paclt, 1963
 Tricholepisma Paclt, 1967
 Trinemura subarmata Paclt, 1982
 Trinemurodes mertoni Paclt, 1961
 Verhoeffilis Paclt, 1972
 Wygodzincinus Paclt, 1963

Ephemeroptera – mayflies
 Ephacerella Paclt, 1994, nomen novum for Acerella Allen, 1971

Coleoptera – beetles
 Deuteroleptidea Paclt, 1946, nomen novum for Leptidea Mulsant, 1839; an unnecessary replacement name, now synonym of the Cerambycinae genus Nathrius

Lepidoptera – butterflies and moths

 Eucedestis Paclt, 1951, now a synonym of the ermine moth genus Cedestis
 Eudalacina Paclt, 1953, now a synonym of the ghost moth genus Eudalaca
 Kenneliola Paclt, 1951, nomen novum for Crobylophora Meyrick, 1880; now a synonym of the Tortricidae genus Cydia
 Lossbergiana pseudodimiata Paclt, 1953, now a synonym of the ghost moth Dalaca pallens
 Apodidae Paclt, 1947, a homonym of Apodidae Hartert, 1897; the valid name for Apodidae Paclt, 1947 is Limacodidae
 Chrysoesthiidae Paclt, 1974, now a synonym of the twirler moths subfamily Gelechiinae

Aves – birds
 Neolepidothrix Paclt, 2009, nomen novum for Lepidothrix Bonaparte, 1854 (Pipridae)

Plants
 Shiuyinghua Paclt, 1962, currently placed in Paulowniaceae

Taxa named after Paclt
Several taxa have been named in honor of Jiří Paclt, such as Pseudosinella paclti Rusek, 1961 (Collembola), Litocampa paclti Condé, 1981 (Diplura) and one generic taxon Pacltiobius Kaplin, 1995 (Archaeognatha), currently treated as a subgenus of Petridiobius.

Publications
Jiří Paclt was a polyglot and published in Czech, Slovak, French, English and German. His very good understanding of Latin and Ancient Greek became evident in his comments on the misrepresentation of scientific names of animals. Furthermore, he did transcriptions from Cyrillic into Latin, but also conversely into Cyrillic, as well as into Japanese, Chinese and Arabic.

When publishing works in Slovakia he often used the name Juraj, the Slovakian form of his first name, instead of the Czech form Jiří.

Paclt published more than 350 scientific articles, most of them without any co-author. An extensive bibliography of his bibliography can be found in Matoušek (2015).

References

1925 births
2015 deaths
Slovak entomologists
Czechoslovak botanists
Slovak botanists
Czechoslovak World War II forced labourers
Czechoslovak entomologists
Charles University alumni